Volkan Babacan (born 11 August 1988) is a Turkish professional footballer who plays as a goalkeeper for İstanbul Başakşehir and the Turkey national football team.

Babacan was a star at the 2005 FIFA U-17 World Championship, taking Turkey to 3rd place. He made his full international debut on 13 October 2014 in a 1–1 draw away to Latvia in UEFA Euro 2016 qualifying.

International career
Volkan Babacan was used for most of the UEFA Euro 2016 Qualifying matches, replacing Volkan Demirel after a dispute with the fans. Out of the 10 matches Babacan played, he got 4 clean sheets. Turkey ended up getting 3rd place and got ranked the best 3rd place team, automatically sending them to the UEFA Euro 2016 finals in France. He was part of the Turkish national team for Euro 2016.

Honours
Fenerbahce
Turkish Super Cup: 2007, 2009

İstanbul Başakşehir
Süper Lig: 2019–20

References

External links

 

1988 births
Living people
Turkish footballers
Turkey under-21 international footballers
Fenerbahçe S.K. footballers
İstanbulspor footballers
Kayserispor footballers
Manisaspor footballers
İstanbul Başakşehir F.K. players
Association football goalkeepers
Süper Lig players
Turkey youth international footballers
TFF First League players
Turkey international footballers
Sportspeople from Antalya
UEFA Euro 2016 players
Mediterranean Games silver medalists for Turkey
Mediterranean Games medalists in football
Competitors at the 2005 Mediterranean Games